Chakirala is one of the villages in Nalgonda district of Telangana.

References

Villages in Nalgonda district